Sadullah Güney also known as Ali Sadullah Bey (Galata, 1883 – June 18, 1945) was an officer of the Ottoman Army and the Turkish Army. He was also the General Director of the Seyr-i Sefain (January 6, 1923 – July 1, 1933).

Medals and decorations
Order of the Medjidie 4th and 3rd class
Order of Osmanieh 4th
Gallipoli Star (Ottoman Empire)
Silver Medal of Liyakat 
Silver Medal of Imtiyaz
Prussia Iron Cross 2nd class
Austria-Hungary Military Merit Medal (Austria-Hungary) 3rd
Austria-Hungary Order of the Iron Crown (Austria) 3rd
Medal of Independence with Red Ribbon

See also
List of high-ranking commanders of the Turkish War of Independence
Armistice of Mudros

External links
Ali Bozoğlu, Sadullah Güney, Denizhaber

Sources

External links

1883 births
1945 deaths
People from Beyoğlu
Ottoman Imperial School of Military Engineering alumni
Ottoman Military College alumni
Ottoman Army officers
Ottoman military personnel of the Italo-Turkish War
Ottoman military personnel of the Balkan Wars
Ottoman military personnel of World War I
Turkish Army officers
Turkish military personnel of the Greco-Turkish War (1919–1922)
Recipients of the Order of the Medjidie, 3rd class
Recipients of the Silver Liakat Medal
Recipients of the Silver Imtiyaz Medal
Recipients of the Iron Cross (1914), 2nd class
Recipients of the Medal of Independence with Red Ribbon (Turkey)